Tommy Chan (1889–19 July 1969) was a New Zealand storekeeper, market gardener and landowner. He was born in Canton, China on 1889.

References

1889 births
1969 deaths
Chinese emigrants to New Zealand
New Zealand gardeners